Alexey Tarasovich Markov (24 March 1802, Veliky Novgorod - 12 March 1878, Saint Petersburg) was a Russian history painter, academician and Professor Emeritus at the Imperial Academy of Arts.

Biography 
His father was a watchmaker. He studied at the Imperial Academy of Arts under Andrey Ivanovich Ivanov, Alexei Yegorov and Vasily Shebuyev;  graduating in 1824, having received several medals. In 1825, he became a "pensioner" of the academy, on condition that he continue to study and improve. He received a gold medal and a stipend for a study trip outside of Russia in 1830, as recognition for his painting "Socrates, Before his Death, Talking with Students About the Immortality of the Soul".

He visited Dresden and Rome, copying frescoes and paintings, notably those of Raphael, as well as producing his own. In 1836, his work "Fortune and the Beggar" brought him the title of Academician. In 1842, for his painting of Christian martyrs in the Colosseum, he was named a Professor (2nd Degree). Ten years later, he was promoted to Professor (1st Degree) and was awarded the title of Distinguished Professor in 1865.

Although he was an excellent craftsman, his chief contribution to Russian art was his diligent teaching. He sought out young artists, who in turn favored his classes when requesting apprenticeships.

In addition to his paintings, he created frescoes and decorative works. One of his most prominent is "Joseph Meeting his Brothers in Egypt", in the attic of Saint Isaac's Cathedral. He also performed the drawings and composition for the depiction of the Trinitarian God on the ceiling of the Cathedral of Christ the Saviour, although the actual work was executed by Ivan Makarov, Ivan Kramskoi, Nikolay Koshelev and Bogdan Wenig.

Works

References

Literature
 
 In the original Russian, this article incorporates text from the ''Brockhaus and Efron Encyclopedic Dictionary, (1890-1907)

External links 

 Saint Petersburg Encyclopedia:Search results for Alexey Markov

1802 births
1878 deaths
Russian painters
Russian male painters
Imperial Academy of Arts alumni
People from Veliky Novgorod
19th-century painters from the Russian Empire
19th-century male artists from the Russian Empire
Members of the Imperial Academy of Arts